The 1984 National Challenge Cup was the 70th edition of the USSF's annual open soccer championship.  
Teams from the North American Soccer League and the American Soccer League declined to participate.  
AO Krete of New York City defeated Chicago Croatian of Chicago in the final game. The score was 4–2.

Final
June 24, 1984 St. Louis Soccer Park – Fenton, Missouri
AO Krete (New York, NY) 4:2 Croatian SC (Chicago, IL)

Scoring Summary
Krete – Mirko Popovski 36′(PK) 81′, Drasko Cvetkovic 55′ n/a’
Croatian – Josip Malkoc 2′, Marinko Volarovic 44′

Lineups
Krete – Lukovic, Cvetkovic, Ost, Carr, Nelson, Kyder, Popovski, Pedraza, McKeown, Estavillo, Malenkov

Croatian – Lisica, Novak, Galovic, Mikulski, Volarevic, Zanic, Losansky, Vlainic, Dosen, Malkos, Tyma (Milenko)

Referee
Klaus Kretschmer

References

External links
 1984 National Challenge Cup – TheCup.us

Nat
U.S. Open Cup